Leonard 'Len' Walter Carter (born 21 November 1942) is a former British sprinter.

Athletics career
At the 1962 British Empire and Commonwealth Games he won the gold medal with the England team in the 4 x 110 yards relay.

References

 Profile at TOPS in athletics

1938 births
Living people
British male sprinters
English male sprinters
Commonwealth Games medallists in athletics
Commonwealth Games gold medallists for England
Athletes (track and field) at the 1962 British Empire and Commonwealth Games
Medallists at the 1962 British Empire and Commonwealth Games